Berghia stephanieae is a species of sea slug, an aeolid nudibranch. It is a marine gastropod mollusc in the family Aeolidiidae. It was previously known as Aeolidiella stephanieae.

Distribution
The range of this species is from the most northern point 25.7°N, to the most southern 25.09°N, and from the most western 80.44°W, to the most eastern 80.2°W.

This is one of the most commonly sold aeolid nudibranchs in the marine aquarium trade in North America, because it is used to control the sea anemone Aiptasia.

Description
The size of the body of this species is up to 20 mm.

Ecology
This sea slug lives in shallow waters from 1 to 2 m in depth. It eats anemones from the genus Aiptasia.

Life cycle 

The development of Berghia stephanieae lasts 60 days at 22 °C. The ontogenetic development of Berghia stephanieae can be subdivided into 8 stages, each recognisable by characteristic morphological and behavioural features as well as specific characters of the nervous system and the muscular system, respectively. The larval nervous system of Berghia stephanieae includes an apical organ, developing central ganglia, and peripheral neurons associated with the velum (a structure used for swimming and particulate food collection), foot and posterior, visceral part of the larva.

In Berghia stephanieae the development is lecithotrophic (feed off a yolk sac). The first pair of cephalic tentacles, the rhinophores, emerge shortly after metamorphosis (30% of development), whereas the second pair, the oral tentacles, appear significantly later in postmetamorphic stages (juvenile stage, 40% of development). The same developmental pattern of cephalic tentacles has been shown in three other nudibranchs, so far (Adalaria proxima, Cadlina laevis and Melibe leonina). The settlement and metamorphosis in Berghia stephanieae larvae are not triggered by their future prey, and most likely therefore the rhinophores develop first after metamorphosis in order to be able to locate their diet, sea anemones.

Embryogenesis and larval development

Early veliger stage
The first detectable structures in the early veliger stage (5-10% of development), the larval shell and the ciliated velar lobes, appear at the same time as the first movements of the larvae (rotation around their anterior-posterior axes).

Veliger stage 
Veliger stage (10-20% of development): The embryo can retract the velum into the shell and the eyes as well as the larval foot (propodium) appear.

Late veliger stage and metamorphosis
Late veliger stage (20-25% of development): The operculum is present and the foot becomes thicker and longer, the embryo hatches shortly prior to metamorphosis. Swimming is accomplished by ciliary beats of the velar cilia.

Metamorphosis (25-30% of development): Usually one day after hatching the larvae settle on the bottom and retract into the larval shell. During the process of metamorphosis, which does not take longer than 48 hours, the animals cast off their larval shell.

Early juvenile stage 
Early juvenile stage (30-40% of development): Slightly after metamorphosis the early juveniles start to crawl on the bottom, which also marks the beginning of the benthic lifestyle.

The eyes indicate the anterior part of the white elongated animals. 24 hours after metamorphosis they crawl at the bottom of the culture dish without feeding. At the same time rhinophore rudiments appear anterior to the eyes as the first pair of cephalic tentacles. Ciliation of the early juveniles is detectable all over the body. At the anterior end and on the tip of the rhinophore rudiments there are cirri, which are compound sensory cilia. Generally, 48 hours after metamorphosis juvenile specimens of Berghia stephanieae start to prey upon pieces of Aiptasia pallida anemones.

Juvenile stage 
Juvenile stage (40-60% of development): At this stage the rudiments of oral tentacles (2nd pair of cephalic tentacles) and the paired, dorsal cerata appear.

The size of the body increases one third in contrast to the previous developmental stage. As the development continues, the length and the thickness of the rhinophores and oral tentacles increases as well as the body size. At this stage additional pairs of cerata appear and on their tip the filled cnidosacs can be detected for the first time.

Late juvenile stage 
As development proceeds, body elongation increases and more pairs of cerata as well as some tentacle-like elongation of the propodium appears.

Mature stage
At the mature stage of Berghia stephanieae, the body size is between 0.8–1 cm, which is ten times bigger than in the previous developmental stage, and the oral tentacles are twice as long as the rhinophores. Reproductive maturity is reached 60 days after oviposition (100% of development). The first egg masses are small and contain 60 to 80 embryos. Mature individuals reach a maximum size of 5 cm, and their egg masses contain 1000 to 2000 embryos.

Central nervous system and periphery 
The neurogenesis of Berghia stephanieae is similar to that of other nudibranchs. The larval nervous system of Berghia stephanieae includes an apical organ, developing central ganglia, and peripheral neurons associated with the velum, foot and posterior part of the larvae. The first neurons containing serotonin and FMRFamide are observed during the early veliger stage (5-10% of development) in the apical organ. Slightly later, in the veliger stage (15% of development), peripheral FMRFamidergic cells appear in the posterior part of the larvae, and persist throughout metamorphosis into the early juvenile stage (30% of development). In other gastropods, these neurons have never been documented to persist during metamorphosis. As in many other gastropods, the ganglia of Berghia stephanieae develop from an anterior to posterior direction in both expression patterns, serotonergic and FMRFamidergic, where the cerebral ganglia develop first followed by the pedal-, and the posterior ganglia. As in other nudibranchs described, the central nervous system of Berghia stephanieae becomes more concentrated during metamorphosis. In the newly metamorphosed Berghia stephanieae rhinophoral ganglia appear as additional neural structures at the same time as the rhinophores start to grow.

Myogenesis 
Berghia stephanieae has a larval retractor muscle and also the accessory larval retractor muscle is present. As in other nudibranchs the post-metamorphic myo-anatomy in Berghia stephanieae is formed de novo. However, regardless the number, larval retractor muscles make no contribution to the post-metamorphic columellar muscle in opisthobranchs.

In the aquarium
Berghia stephanieae is considered one of the best predators for Aiptasia sp., sea anemones that are usually considered pests in the marine aquarium hobby, because they are stressful to coral around them, and occasionally even sting fish and desirable invertebrates. Because Berghia stephanieae only eat Aiptasias, the nudibranchs will die of starvation when all the anemones are gone, so this situation must be taken into account. Prior to the description of Berghia stephanieae in 2005, that species from the aquaria have been called as "Berghia verrucicornis".

References
This article incorporates CC-BY-2.0 text from the reference.

External links 

Aeolidiidae
Gastropods described in 2005